Oil Spill Response Limited (OSRL) is a British firm specializing in managing oil spills. The company was founded in 1985 and employs about 300 people at nine locations. Shareholders are all major oil companies such as BHP Billiton, Chevron Corporation, Eni, ExxonMobil, Petronas, Saudi Aramco, Shell plc, Statoil and Total.

Financial and Corporate Structure

OSRL is industry-developed and co-financed by a cooperative for emergency response. Funding is provided by the annual contributions of its 44 stakeholders and 118 extraordinary members, as well as income from operations, the latter having an increasingly important role in financing, accounting for about 38.1% of the revenue of the year 2014 from the contributions of the participating oil companies, while in 2013 still 39.1% 2,012 39.8% and 2011 about 44% were. The share of contributions to profit of 2014 was estimated at 27%.
In addition to a central alerting centre, the range of services offered includes training for specialists (such as underwater welders), rental and arranging of special equipment (rescue vessels, material), deployment coordination and technical advice. The main focus is on the prevention and removal of oil pollution on the high seas and in coastal waters.

Fleet

Oil Spill Response operates a fleet of aircraft as part of their resources for surveying and remediation of oil spill-related incidents. The aircraft operate under the name 2Excel Aviation.

References

External links
 Official website

Companies based in Southampton
Co-operatives in England
Oil spill remediation technologies
Petroleum industry in the United Kingdom
Airlines of the United Kingdom
Service companies of the United Kingdom